Archernis capitalis is a moth in the family Crambidae. It was described by Johan Christian Fabricius in 1794. It is found in India and Sri Lanka.

References

Moths described in 1794
Spilomelinae
Moths of Asia